Junior was a German preschool TV channel which was on air from 1996 to 2022, aimed at children between three and seven years of age. The channel formerly timeshared with Junior includes K-Toon [de] and aired an anime programming block called Junior XL between 2003 and 2007.

The channel closed on 31 December 2022.

References

Children's television networks
Television stations in Germany
Television channels and stations established in 1996
Television channels and stations disestablished in 2022
German-language television stations
Preschool education television networks
Defunct television channels in Germany